is a professional Japanese baseball player. He plays outfielder for the Hanshin Tigers.

External links

 NPB.com

1993 births
Living people
Baseball people from Yokohama
Japanese baseball players
Nippon Professional Baseball outfielders
Hanshin Tigers players